Grandma's House is a sitcom television series broadcast on BBC Two. Written by Simon Amstell and long-term collaborator Dan Swimer, the series stars Simon Amstell playing a version of himself: an ex-television presenter searching for meaning in his life. Each episode takes place at his grandmother's house, where Grandma (Linda Bassett) welcomes her family, desperate to see everyone happy.

The first series was shown in 2010, the second in 2012. In December 2012 Amstell stated that there would not be a third series.

Cast and characters

Production
The show was created and written by Simon Amstell and Dan Swimer. Six 30-minutes episodes were produced for the first series by Tiger Aspect Productions for BBC Two. These were filmed at Pinewood Studios.

The house used for exterior filming is located in Highwood Gardens in Clayhall, Greater London.

On 1 July 2010, Geoffrey Hutchings, who portrayed Grandpa, died. The death of his character was said to have occurred between the two series.

Episodes

Series 1 (2010)

Series 2 (2012)

Critical reception
The show has received a generally positive reaction from critics and audiences alike. 
TV.com's Ruth Margolis claimed that "[Amstell's] written a sitcom stuffed with gently funny moments and acerbic gems", but suggested "a few more naturalistic pauses would have just polished this into the self-assured comedy it so wants to be." Other publications had differing opinions. UK's Metro''' claimed on their website that "[Amstell's] brilliantly funny but we won’t be inviting him round for tea." Sam Wollaston of The Guardian asked, "Can Simon act, though? Well, it's hard to know really, given that he's essentially just being himself", but comes around to the opinion that "Grandma's House is sharply written, with some nice lines and a bit of edge to it." Two weeks later, Wollaston revealed "I'm enjoying Grandma's House more and more (...) there's a subtlety and a sharpness about it. And yeah, it's funny."

Jewish media outlets such as the Jewish Chronicle were pleased that the show was bringing Jewish humour to mainstream audiences and the newspaper also described the show as "genius".

Awards

DVD release
2 Entertain released the first series of Grandma's House'' on DVD on 20 September 2010; it includes all six episodes, a making-of documentary, a booklet and an audio commentary on one of the episodes by Amstell and his mother.

International broadcast
In Australia, the first season commenced airing on ABC2 each Thursday at 10pm from 23 February 2012.

References

External links

2010s British sitcoms
2010 British television series debuts
2012 British television series endings
BBC television sitcoms
2010s British LGBT-related comedy television series
Jewish comedy and humor
Television series by Endemol
Television shows set in London